In 1963, the U.S. Department of Defense established a designation system for rockets and guided missiles jointly used by all the United States armed services. It superseded the separate designation systems the Air Force and Navy had for designating US guided missiles and drones, but also a short-lived interim USAF system for guided missiles and rockets.

History
On 11 December 1962, the U.S. Department of Defense issued Directive 4000.20 “Designating, Redesignating, and Naming Military Rockets and Guided Missiles” which called for a joint designation system for rockets and missiles which was to be used by all armed forces services. The directive was implemented via Air Force Regulation (AFR) 66-20, Army Regulation (AR) 705-36, Bureau of Weapons Instruction (BUWEPSINST) 8800.2 on 27 June 1963. A subsequent directive, DoD Directive 4120.15 "Designating and Naming Military Aircraft, Rockets, and Guided Missiles", was issued on 24 November 1971 and implemented via Air Force Regulation (AFR) 82-1/Army Regulation (AR) 70-50/Naval Material Command Instruction (NAVMATINST) 8800.4A on 27 March 1974. Within AFR 82-1/AR 70-50/NAVMATINST 8800.4A, the 1963 rocket and guided missile designation system was presented alongside the 1962 United States Tri-Service aircraft designation system and the two systems have been concurrently presented and maintained in joint publications since.

The current version of the rocket and missile designation system was mandated by Joint Regulation 4120.15E Designating and Naming Military Aerospace Vehicles and was implemented via Air Force Instruction (AFI) 16-401, Army Regulation (AR) 70-50, Naval Air Systems Command Instruction (NAVAIRINST) 13100.16 on 3 November 2020. The list of military rockets and guided missiles was maintained via 4120.15-L Model Designation of Military Aerospace Vehicles until its transition to data.af.mil on 31 August 2018.

Explanation
The basic designation of every rocket and guided missile is based in a set of letters called the Mission Design Sequence. The sequence indicates the following:
 The environment from which the weapon is launched
 The primary mission of the weapon
 The type of weapon

Examples of guided missile designators are as follows:
 AGM – (A) Air-launched  (G) Surface-attack   (M) Guided missile
 AIM – (A) Air-launched  (I) Intercept-aerial (M) Guided missile
 ATM – (A) Air-launched  (T) Training         (M) Guided missile
 RIM – (R) Ship-launched (I) Intercept-aerial (M) Guided missile
 LGM – (L) Silo-launched (G) Surface-attack   (M) Guided missile

The design or project number follows the basic designator. In turn, the number may be followed by consecutive letters, representing modifications.

Example:
 RGM-84D means:
 R – The weapon is ship-launched;
 G – The weapon is designed to surface-attack;
 M – The weapon is a guided missile;
 84 – eighty-fourth missile design;
 D – fourth modification;

In addition, most guided missiles have names, such as Harpoon, Tomahawk, Seasparrow, etc. These names are retained regardless of subsequent modifications to the missile.

Code

Prefixes

An X preceding the first letter indicates an experimental weapon, a Y preceding the first letter means the weapon is a prototype, and a Z preceding the first letter indicates a design in the planning phase.

See also 
 List of missiles
 1962 United States Tri-Service aircraft designation system
 United States military aircraft designation systems

Notes

References

External links 

Guided missiles
Weapons of the United States
Naming conventions
Rocketry